Prince Henry's Grammar School may refer to:

 Prince Henry's Grammar School, Evesham
 Prince Henry's Grammar School, Otley